The Archbishop Mihayo University College of Tabora (AMUCTA) is a constituent college of St. Augustine University of Tabora, Tanzania.

References

External links
 

Colleges in Tanzania
St. Augustine University of Tanzania
Educational institutions established in 2010
2010 establishments in Tanzania